Novosphingobium aquiterrae  is a Gram-negative, rod-shaped, strictly aerobic, non-spore-forming and non-motile bacterium from the genus Novosphingobium which has been isolated from ground water from Daejeon in Korea.

References

Bacteria described in 2014
Sphingomonadales